Sanyang Plaza station, is an interchange station of Line 1 and Line 2 of the Wuxi Metro. It opened for operations on 1 July 2014. It is the largest metro station in China.

Station Layout

Exits
There are 27 exits for this station.

Gallery

References

Railway stations in Jiangsu
Wuxi Metro stations
Railway stations in China opened in 2014